Rasheed Butt (born 1944) is a Pakistani calligrapher. Active since 1961, he has worked in a number of calligraphic styles, including reproductions of texts from the Qur'an, the hadith, traditional invocations and prayers and poetry. He also produces hilya calligraphy.
Celebrated calligraphist Rasheed Butt (b.1944) belongs to a Kashmiri family. The artist started his career as a calligrapher at a newspaper. However, it was in 1967 when he fully committed to the craft as he apprenticed under Khwaja Mahmood Akhtar and Hafiz Yousuf Sadidi.
Butt has been the recipient of the Pride of Performance in 1989. The artist has widely exhibited locally and internationally. His pieces can be found in numerous museums, private collections and monuments including the Pakistani Senate, Al-Furqan Foundation (UK) and Mecca Gate, Saudi Arabia. Butt is one of the few living Islamic calligraphers whose work has been auctioned through Christie's, London.
Rasheed Butt has served as a Professor at National College of Arts (2008-2009) and Fatima Jinnah Women's University (2006-2010), both located in Rawalpindi, Pakistan. He has also conducted several calligraphy workshops.
Butt's calligraphic inscriptions fall under four categories – Qur’anic Suras (chapters of the Qur’an) and Verses (Ayat), Hadith (traditions and sayings attributed to Muhammad), traditional invocations or prayers, and fourthly Poetry (Arabic and Persian). Furthermore, he is the first Pakistani artist to use the forgotten art of Illumination with his calligraphy.
The artist claims that he is fascinated by the "timeless and captivating message of the Holy Qur’an and Sunnah" and takes great pleasure in spreading this message through his masterpieces. Butt further states that he "does not sleep a single night without concentrating on ways and means of enhancing his contribution to Islamic calligraphy."
The artist's works were showcased in a ground breaking exhibition at Khaas Gallery, Islamabad in 2011,that highlighted his achievements as one of Pakistan's most eminent master calligraphers.

References

External links
 

Living people
Pakistani artists
Pakistani calligraphers
Calligraphers of Arabic script
1944 births
Pakistani people of Kashmiri descent